Rick Benjamin was the fifth poet laureate of the American State of Rhode Island. His term began in 2013 and ended in 2017. Benjamin left the position of Poet Laureate to accept a teaching position at the University of California, Santa Barbara.

References

External links
Rick Benjamin website

Year of birth missing (living people)
Living people
Poets from Rhode Island
Writers from Rhode Island
Poets Laureate of Rhode Island